Norne Securities AS is a Norwegian investment bank. The firm has total assets of over NOK 400 billion, 170 offices and 660,000 customers.

History
 In 2008, Norne Securities was founded in Bergen, Norway by 15 independent Norwegian savings banks
 In 2012, Norne Securities acquired Terra Markets from Norwegian savings bank, Eika Gruppen

Ownership
Norne Securities is owned by 15 independent Norwegian savings banks

References

External links
Norne Securities Website
Norne Securities Facebook
Norne Securities Twitter

Financial services companies of Norway
Banks of Norway
Companies based in Oslo
Companies based in Bergen
Banks established in 2008
Financial services companies established in 2008
Norwegian companies established in 2008